is a 2008 Japanese film starring Sayuri Yoshinaga and directed by Yoji Yamada.

The film was based on the autobiographical novel by Teruyo Nogami, who for many years worked with director Akira Kurosawa, often as script supervisor.

Plot
Set in Tokyo in 1940, the peaceful life of the Nogami Family suddenly changes when the father, Shigeru, is arrested and accused of being a Communist. His wife Kayo works frantically from morning to night to maintain the household and bring up her two daughters with the support of Shigeru's sister Hisako and Shigeru's former student Yamazaki, but her husband does not return. World War II breaks out and casts dark shadows on the entire country, but Kayo still tries to keep her cheerful determination, and sustain the family with her love. This is an emotional drama of a mother and an eternal message for peace.

Cast
 Sayuri Yoshinaga as Kayo Nogami
 Tadanobu Asano as Yamazaki Toru
 Rei Dan as Hisako Nogami
 Mirai Shida as Hatsuko Nogami
 Miku Satō as Teruyo Nogami
 Umenosuke Nakamura as Kyūtarō Fujioka
 Takashi Sasano
 Denden
 Bandō Mitsugorō X as Shigeru Nogami
 Mizuho Suzuki as Hajime Nikaido
 Chieko Baisho as Hatsuko Nogami (adult)
 Keiko Toda as Teruyo Nogami (adult)
 Yōji Matsuda as Shimazaki
 Michie Tomizawa
 Mayumi Tanaka
 Kumiko Nishihara
 Masuo Amada
 Daisuke Gōri

Reception
The film received several nominations at the 32nd Japan Academy Film Prize, including for Best Film, Best Director, Best Actress for Sayuri Yoshinaga, Best Supporting Actor for Tadanobu Asano and Best Supporting Actress for Rei Dan.

See also 
 Japanese resistance during the Shōwa period

References

External links
 

2008 films
Films directed by Yoji Yamada
Films shot in Tokyo
Shochiku films
Films with screenplays by Yôji Yamada
2000s Japanese films